Hans Stoll (born 28 March 1941) is an Austrian bobsledder. He competed in the four-man event at the 1964 Winter Olympics.

References

1941 births
Living people
Austrian male bobsledders
Olympic bobsledders of Austria
Bobsledders at the 1964 Winter Olympics
Sportspeople from Innsbruck